This list of tallest buildings in New Jersey ranks skyscrapers and high-rises in the U.S. state of New Jersey by height. It is the 41st tallest building in the United States. The 42-story 30 Hudson Street, known widely as the Goldman Sachs Tower, which rises 781 feet (238 m) at Exchange Place in Jersey City is the state's tallest commercial building. It is also the 81st-tallest building in the United States. The tallest building in New Jersey outside Jersey City is the 57-story Ocean Resort Casino, which rises 709 ft (216 m) in Atlantic City and ranks as the second-tallest casino tower in the United States.

Tallest buildings
This includes spires and architectural details but does not include antenna masts. The "Year" column indicates the year in which a building was completed.

Timeline of tallest buildings

See also
 List of tallest buildings in Atlantic City
 List of tallest buildings in Camden
 List of tallest buildings in Fort Lee
 List of tallest buildings in Jersey City
 List of tallest buildings in New Brunswick
 List of tallest buildings in Newark
 List of tallest buildings in New York City
 List of tallest buildings in North Hudson

References

 
 
New Jersey